Rhythm of a Crime is a Yugoslav film released in Yugoslavia in 1981, directed by Zoran Tadić, starring Ivica Vidović and Fabijan Šovagović. It is based on "Dobri duh Zagreba", a short story by Pavao Pavličić.

In 1999, a poll of Croatian film critics found it to be one of the best Croatian films ever made.

Plot
Old houses in Zagreb are destroyed in order to build new, bigger blocks. A teacher who lives in one of these houses allows a stranger to share his home with him. The stranger has a fascination with statistics, and claims he can predict crimes based on statistical analyses. When a predicted murder did not occur, the stranger is adamant that the whole town will suffer unless a balance is achieved - and he leaves.

Cast 
 Ivica Vidović - Ivica
 Fabijan Šovagović - Fabijan
 Božidarka Frajt - Zdenka

References

Further reading
 Ritam zločina 
 Ritam zločina

External links
 
 Entry in Balkan Film Database

1981 films
1980s Croatian-language films
Yugoslav crime drama films
Films based on works by Croatian writers
Films set in Zagreb
Croatian crime drama films
Croatian black-and-white films
Yugoslav black-and-white films
1981 directorial debut films
Croatian horror films
1981 crime drama films